Deepak Tangri (born 1 February 1999) is an Indian professional footballer who plays as a defensive midfielder or defender for Indian Super League club ATK Mohun Bagan.

Club career
Tangri started his football career with Mohun Bagan. In November 2017, it was announced that Tangri was selected to play for the Indian Arrows, an All India Football Federation owned team that would consist of India under-20 players to give them playing time. He made his professional debut for the side on 5 December 2017 against Minerva Punjab. He started but couldn't prevent the Indian Arrows from losing 2–0.

ATK Mohun Bagan FC 
On 29th June 2021, Deepak Tangri was signed by ATK Mohun Bagan FC on a two year contract.

International career
At international level, Tangri had represented India at U-19 and U-23 level.

Career statistics

Club

References

1999 births
Living people
Indian footballers
Mohun Bagan AC players
Indian Arrows players
Association football defenders
I-League players
Indian Super League players
Chennaiyin FC players
India youth international footballers
Footballers from Punjab, India